A by-election was held in the New South Wales state electoral district of Monaro on 23 November 1918. The by-election was triggered by the death  of Gus Miller.

Result

Gus Miller died.

See also
Electoral results for the district of Monaro
List of New South Wales state by-elections

Notes

References

New South Wales state by-elections
1918 elections in Australia
1910s in New South Wales